The bridge unofficially known as the Alva Bridge is a small two-lane drawbridge located in Alva, Florida.  The bridge is 21 feet tall and it is one of four vehicle drawbridges in Lee County.  The bridge carries Broadway over the Caloosahatchee River.

History
The first bridge at this site was a small swing bridge constructed in 1903, and it was the closest bridge to Fort Myers up until 1924.  In 1925, the original bridge was replaced with a new swing bridge.  The old swing bridge was then dismantled and taken to Matlacha, Florida, where it operated as the Matlacha Bridge for a year before being destroyed by a hurricane.  The new swing bridge operated until 1966, when it was destroyed by a barge transporting rocket parts to the Kennedy Space Center.  The second swing bridge then had to be replaced by the current drawbridge, a bascule-type bridge which opened in 1969, after three years of construction.

References

Road bridges in Florida
Bridges in Lee County, Florida
Bridges completed in 1903
Bridges completed in 1925
Bridges completed in 1969
Bascule bridges in the United States
Bridges over the Caloosahatchee River
1903 establishments in Florida
Concrete bridges in the United States